The 33rd Tank Regiment is an inactive tank regiment of the Italian Army last based in Civitavecchia in Lazio. Originally the regiment, like all Italian tank units, was part of the infantry, but on 1 June 1999 it became part of the cavalry. Operationally the regiment was last assigned to the Mechanized Brigade "Granatieri di Sardegna".

History

Formation 
The regiment was formed on 6 November 1939 in Parma as 33rd Tank Infantry Regiment with four tank battalions, which were ceded by two tank infantry regiments: from the 3rd Tank Infantry Regiment arrived the VI Assault Tanks Battalion "Lollini" and XXXII Assault Tanks Battalion "Battisti", and from 1st Tank Infantry Regiment arrived the XXII Assault Tanks Battalion "Coralli" and the XXIII Assault Tanks Battalion "Stennio. On the same day the 33rd regiment, together with the 12th Bersaglieri Regiment and the 133rd Armored Artillery Regiment, entered the newly raised 133rd Armored Division "Littorio". In April 1940 battalions were renamed and the regiment entered World War II with the following structure:

 33rd Tank Infantry Regiment, in Parma
 I Tank Battalion "L" (L3/35 tankettes, former VI Assault Tanks Battalion "Lollini")
 II Tank Battalion "L" (L3/35 tankettes, former XXII Assault Tanks Battalion "Coralli")
 III Tank Battalion "L" (L3/35 tankettes, former XXIII Assault Tanks Battalion "Stennio")
 IV Tank Battalion "L" (L3/35 tankettes, former XXXII Assault Tanks Battalion "Battisti")

World War II 

The regiment participated in June 1940 in the Italian invasion of France. The first Italian tankers of World War II were killed in action near the Little St Bernard Pass between France and Italy. In fall 1940 the I Tank Battalion "L" was sent to North Africa to reinforce Italian units in the Western Desert Campaign. To replace it the regiment raised on 22 December 1940 the VI Tank Battalion "M13/40", which was sent immediately to Africa to shore up the crumbling Italian 10th Army, which was retreating under pressure of the British Operation Compass offensive. The VI battalion arrived in Libya in early January 1941 and already by 6 February the battalion had been destroyed in the Battle of Beda Fomm and was declared lost.

In April 1941 the regiment participated in the Invasion of Yugoslavia. On 30 July 1941 the III Tank Battalion "L" was disbanded and its two companies transferred to the regiment's I and II battalion. In August 1941 the regiment formed XIV Tank Battalion "M14/41". In October both "L" battalions left the regiment and moved to Sardinia to garrison the island. On 27 November 1941 the regiment was replaced in the 133rd Armored Division "Littorio" by the newly raised 133rd Tank Infantry Regiment. The regiment was now under the Military Zone Command "Piacenza" and consisted of the XIV Tank Battalion "M14/41", a training battalion, and two replacement battalions with troops but no equipment.

On 1 February 1942 the regiment was reorganized and meant to receive three additional "M" battalions, but only the XVIII arrived from the 3rd Tank Infantry Regiment, while the XVII, raised by the 4th Tank Infantry Regiment, was transferred to the 31st Tank Infantry Regiment, which also retained command of the XIX battalion. At the time all three battalions fielded one M14/41 tank company and one Semovente 75/18 tank destroyer company.

Beginning on 24 April 1942 the regiment began to rise battalions equipped with Semovente 47/32 tank destroyers:

 IV Semoventi Battalion "47/32", raised on 24 April 1942, assigned to the 4th Infantry Division "Livorno", destroyed during the Allied invasion of Sicily in July 1943
 CXXXIII Semoventi Battalion "47/32", raised on 1 May 1942, assigned to the 6th Army, destroyed during the Allied invasion of Sicily in July 1943
 CCXXXIII Semoventi Battalion "47/32", raised on 1 October 1942, assigned to the 6th Army, destroyed during the Allied invasion of Sicily in July 1943

In August 1942 the XIV Tank Battalion "M14/41" was transferred to the 31st Tank Infantry Regiment, which departed for North Africa. At the same time the regiment received new M15/42 tanks for its XVIII Tank Battalion "M15/42", which the regiment transferred on 27 June 1943 to the 32nd Tank Infantry Regiment on Sardinia. After Italy switched sides with the Armistice of Cassibile on 8 September 1943 the Germans occupied Italy and disbanded the 33rd Tank Infantry Regiment soon after.

Cold War 
On 1 September 1964 the Italian Army raised the VI Tank Battalion equipped M47 Patton tanks in Civitavecchia as the tank unit of the 1st Armored Bersaglieri Regiment.

6th Tank Battalion "M.O. Scapuzzi" 
During the 1975 army reform the 1st Armored Bersaglieri Regiment was disbanded and on 1 October 1975 the VI Tank Battalion became the 6th Tank Battalion "M.O. Scapuzzi", which received the flag and traditions of the 33rd Tank Infantry Regiment. The battalion's number commemorated the VI Tank Battalion "M", which the 33rd regiment had raised and which had been destroyed during the British Operation Compass offensive. Tank and armored battalions created during the 1975 army reform were all named for officers, soldiers and partisans, who were posthumously awarded Italy's highest military honor the Gold Medal of Military Valour during World War II. The 6th Tank Battalion's name commemorated CCXXXIII Semoventi Battalion "47/32" Second lieutenant Luigi Scapuzzi, who was killed in action during the Allied invasion of Sicily in July 1943  . Based in Civitavecchia and equipped with M47 Patton tanks the battalion joined the Mechanized Brigade "Granatieri di Sardegna".

Recent times 
With the end of the Cold War the Italian Army drew down its forces and the army began to reform single-battalion regiments for traditional reasons. On 1 September 1993 the 6th Tank Battalion "M.O. Scapuzzi" ceded the flag of the 33rd regiment to the 11th Tank Battalion "M.O. Calzecchi" in Ozzano dell'Emilia, which in turn ceded the flag of the 4th Tank Regiment to the 6th Tank Battalion, which on the same date reformed as 4th Tank Regiment. The 33rd regiment was now the tank unit of the Mechanized Brigade "Friuli". However, as the Friuli was earmarked to become Italy's only Air Assault brigade the 33rd Tank Regiment transferred to the 132nd Armored Brigade "Ariete" in 1997.

In 2001 the 33rd Tank Regiment was disbanded and its flag transferred to the Shrine of the Flags in the Vittoriano in Rome.

See also 
 Mechanized Brigade "Granatieri di Sardegna"

References

Tank Regiments of Italy
1939 establishments in Italy